Bringer of Plagues is the second studio album by American metal band Divine Heresy, released on July 28, 2009. It is the band's only album to feature vocalist Travis Neal and bassist Joe Payne, and the last to feature drummer Tim Yeung.

On June 3, 2009, two new songs from the album, titled "Undivine Prophecies" and "Facebreaker", were posted on the band's MySpace page.

The album sold around 3,000 copies in the United States in its first week to debut at position No. 148 on the Billboard 200 chart.

Critical reception
According to Kerrang!, the album sees Dino Cazares "honing  his partnership with ex-Nile sticksman Tim Yeung to the point of thunderous, jaw-dropping intensity and roping in the vocal talents of alarmingly diverse newcomer Travis Neal." Still, "there's little new ground broken here and attempted slow/heavy dynamics are often poorly executed, leaving the feeling that although accomplished, this is metal on demand rather than any kind of real statement of the heart," warns reviewer Sam Low, giving it the 3/5 rating.

Track listing

Credits
Divine Heresy
 Travis Neal – vocals
 Dino Cazares – guitars
 Joe Payne – bass
 Tim Yeung – drums

Production
 Engineered, produced and mixed by Logan Mader and Lucas Banker for Dirty Icon Productions
 Co-Produced by Dino Cazares
 Mastered by Dirty Icon Productions
 Recorded, mixed and mastered at Edge of the Earth Studios, Hollywood, California
 Drums recorded at Mid City Sound
 Pre-production: Jeramiah Curo at DeadSpace Studios, Barona, California
 Orchestral arrangements on "The End Begins" by Jonathan Merkel
 Drums arrangements by John Sankey
 Keyboards on "Undivine Prophecies" and "The End Begins" by Jonathan Merkel
 Additional keyboards on "Darkness Embedded" by Rhys Fulber
 Guitar tech: Alex Lagos
 A&R by Scott Koenig (Divine Heresy) and Ray Harkins (Century Media)
 Photography by Glen LaFerman

Charts

References

2009 albums
Divine Heresy albums
Century Media Records albums
Roadrunner Records albums
Albums produced by Logan Mader